Darren Grimes (born 22 July 1993) is a British right-wing political commentator and activist. A Liberal Democrat activist before dropping out of university, he then worked for a number of Brexit campaigns. He set up the website Reasoned in May 2020.

Early life
Grimes grew up in a single-parent household in Consett, County Durham, England. He is openly gay. He studied fashion and business studies at the University of Brighton but did not complete his degree.

Activism
While at university, Grimes was an activist for the Liberal Democrats, and worked for then-MP Norman Lamb's unsuccessful 2015 party leadership campaign. In summer 2015 he was interviewed by the BBC about his admiration for former Lib Dem leader Charles Kennedy, praising Kennedy's vocal pro-EU stance and saying it could have helped the Remain side in the forthcoming referendum: "He believed that in an increasingly globalised world, having Britain in Europe was the only way forward. And I think that's the message the party needs pushing."

However, by the following year Grimes' political stance had changed and he founded the pro-Brexit group BeLeave aimed at younger voters during the 2016 United Kingdom European Union membership referendum campaign.

Grimes later dropped out of university, and between 2016 and 2018, he worked as a deputy editor for the political website BrexitCentral, founded by Matthew Elliott, the former Vote Leave chief executive. In 2018, he became the digital manager for the Institute of Economic Affairs (IEA), a free market think tank.

In 2019, he was amongst those associated with a newly launched right-wing youth organisation called Turning Point UK (TPUK), set up by Conservative Party donor and unsuccessful Brexit Party MEP candidate George Farmer. It is closely allied to Turning Point USA, a pro-Trump youth movement.

In May 2020 Grimes launched Reasoned, a website aimed at those "standing against the tide" who "hide [their] political views for fear of being called homophobic, a TERF, [or] racist". It is a rebranding of a previous conservative youth group called Reason, and is backed by the son of former Brexit Party MEP Lance Forman. According to the satirical magazine Private Eye, a video was released in 2020 by Grimes on Reasoned that appeared to be a near word-for-word copy of a video released by the US right-wing platform PragerU. Facebook adverts for the group placed in 2018 were paid for by "Your Channel Media", a company owned and run by TPUK chief executive Oliver Anisfeld.

In July 2020, an interview with the historian David Starkey that Grimes published on his video platform sparked controversy. The historian remarked that "Slavery was not genocide, otherwise there wouldn't be so many damn blacks in Africa or in Britain, would there?" This prompted criticism, including condemnation by former Chancellor of the Exchequer Sajid Javid, and Grimes tweeted that "I reject in the strongest possible terms what Dr Starkey said in that clip and so very wish I'd caught it at the time." The Metropolitan Police opened an investigation into Grimes on the suspicion of stirring up racial hatred, and requested to interview Grimes. The former director of public prosecutions Ken Macdonald called the investigation "deeply threatening of free speech", a view which was echoed by some Conservative Party MPs. The investigation concluded without any charges being brought.

In July 2021, Grimes sent a tweet to Marcus Rashford following the England football team's defeat in the Euro 2020 Final at which Rashford missed a penalty kick. Grimes tweeted: "Honestly though @MarcusRashford, penalties not politics from now on, aye?", referring to Rashford's successful lobbying to extend the provision of free school meals. Grimes' comment was criticised by various people on social media as insensitive.

Electoral Commission case
In 2018, Grimes was fined £20,000 by the Electoral Commission after it determined that there was evidence that BeLeave had spent more than £675,000 with the Canadian political consultancy firm AggregateIQ in coordination with the official Brexit campaign organisation Vote Leave in distribution targeted social media advertisements. The Commission argued that these actions violated electoral spending rules, and that both Grimes and Vote Leave official David Alan Halsall had made false declarations relating to the spending. Grimes appealed, claiming that his misstatements were unintentional. He won the appeal and his fine was overturned; Vote Leave, however, withdrew its appeal and paid fines totalling £61,000. Subsequently, in May 2020, the Metropolitan Police ended its investigation into Grimes and Halsall. In June 2021, the Chairman of the Electoral Commission apologised to Grimes in a Sunday Telegraph interview.

Broadcasting

In January 2022, Grimes began presenting his own weekend show on GB News called Real Britain. The show was cancelled in November 2022.

See also

 Facebook–Cambridge Analytica data scandal

References

External links

British activists
Living people
English gay men
People from Consett
Conservative Party (UK) people
1993 births
Alumni of the University of Brighton
LGBT conservatism
Liberal Democrats (UK) people
GB News newsreaders and journalists
21st-century English LGBT people